Catherine Jourdan (12 October 1948 – 18 February 2011) was a French actress. She appeared in 22 films and television shows between 1967 and 1989. She starred in the 1970 film Eden and After, which was entered into the 20th Berlin International Film Festival.

Filmography

References

External links

1948 births
2011 deaths
French film actresses
People from Indre-et-Loire
20th-century French actresses